Tomodachi Life is a social simulation video game developed by Nintendo SPD and published by Nintendo for the Nintendo 3DS. The game follows the day-to-day interactions of Mii characters (referred to as "islanders") as they build friendships, solve problems, and converse with the player. Tomodachi Life is the sequel to the Japan-exclusive Nintendo DS title Tomodachi Collection.

It was released in Japan in April 2013, June 2014 in North America, Europe, and Australia, and July 2014 in South Korea. With over 6.71 million copies sold worldwide, it was the eleventh best-selling 3DS game of all time.
 
The game received mixed reviews as users praised its gameplay and overall charm, but criticized its simplistic minigames and lack of general user control. With over 400 thousand units sold in Japan in its debut week, the game is widely considered to be a success. Tomodachi Life introduced a level of Mii customizability that was expanded upon in future Nintendo games, such as Miitopia and the social networking app Miitomo.

Gameplay
The game begins with the player naming their island and creating their lookalike or personal Mii. The Miis are assigned unique personalities based on selections the player makes for the Mii's stats, such as walking speed, speech, and quirkiness. The player will be prompted to give their look-alike with food to eat and a friend to interact with. Afterward, the Town Hall will open, giving access to create more Miis. Miis can perform various actions and many interactions can occur between them, such as friendship, romance, conflicts, and other social events. As the game goes by, the player unlocks more locations, clothes, food, and other things for the Miis to interact with.

By interacting with the islanders, resolving their problems, and giving gifts, the player will be awarded with in-game currency.

Tomodachi Life is set in real time, and encourages players to interact at different times of the day in order to observe different interactions with islanders. Over time, the islanders will interact and develop friendships with each other at random intervals. If 2 Islanders of the opposite gender and similar age interact, one may confess their love to the other, which upon success, sets them as their "Sweetheart", which can allow for marriage with them after more interaction. Eventually, if a married couple is on the island, the player will receive a phone call from either the mother or the father, informing the player that they had a baby, and allowing the player to name it and edit its face. After this, the married couple may ask the player to babysit the child, which would start a minigame, changing depending on the age of the child. Eventually, the child will grow up, and the player is presented with 2 options. The player can either move the child to the apartments, or send the child off via StreetPass, to appear in other islands.

Local and online capabilities
Using StreetPass and SpotPass, the player can unlock special items and transport islanders. Nintendo would release free Spotpass items monthly to all players that had Spotpass enabled, which would be purchasable in "Import Wear". On May 16, 2016, the last "Import Item" was released, discontinuing the service. Using Streetpass, the player can choose a specific item to give to players nearby their Nintendo 3DS System, which is also used to transport a married couples child to other islands as a traveler. Using the Nintendo 3DS Image Share service, players can share screenshots taken in game to social networks such as Twitter or Facebook.

Development
Tomodachi Life was originally released as Tomodachi Collection: New Life in Japan as the sequel to Tomodachi Collection. On March 13, 2013, Nintendo announced in their latest Nintendo Direct that along two new special edition 3DS LL colors, a sequel to Tomodachi Collection was soon going to be released to the public. The first color showcased in the direct was a mint white edition 3DS LL, and the second was included as a part of a hardware bundle with Tomodachi Collection: New Life included, designed with the game in mind. In another Nintendo Direct broadcast on April 3, 2013, Nintendo revealed more details related to the 3DS sequel and introduced software used to transfer Mii data from the original game to the sequel called "Tomodachi Collection: New Life Mii Moving Software", which could be downloaded from the Nintendo eShop. On April 18, 2013, the game was released in Japan.

Western release
A western release for Tomodachi Collection: New Life was heavily considered during and after the game's release in Japan. Satoru Iwata told the Wall Street Journal on January 29, 2014 that "the company is now working on the right balance of localizing Japan-oriented games just enough so that foreign audiences can enjoy them", hinting directly at an overseas launch for the game. Although Nintendo still hadn't announced the release of Tomodachi Collection: New Life for regions outside Japan at the time, in late March 2014, Nintendo of Europe launched a survey containing multiple screenshots of what appeared to be localized versions of the game in English, French, and Spanish. Screenshots provided in the survey included localized versions of some gameplay, like player and Mii interactions.

On April 10, 2014, Nintendo announced in a Nintendo Direct that Tomodachi Collection: New Lifes localization would be releasing as "Tomodachi Life" in North America and Europe. In May 2014, a playable demo of the game was distributed to Platinum members of Club Nintendo in North America, the data of which could be transferred to the final version to unlock a bonus in-game item. The game was bundled with two Nintendo eShop download codes for a 'Welcome version' demo, which could be given to friends. A slightly different demo version was later publicly released for download via the Nintendo eShop, which did not unlock any features in the full game. The next month on June 6, the game was released in both regions.

Former Super Metroid director Yoshio Sakamoto stated "development began when we started thinking about if it was possible to make a DS game which players could not only enjoy inside of the game, but one which could also trigger communication outside of it". Bill Trinen, Senior Director of Product Marketing for Nintendo described the idea of Tomodachi Life's interaction system in an interview with Polygon by using the following scenario: "What if everybody you say in those funny videos on YouTube were actually people that you knew, and those crazy things that were happening were happening to people that you knew?" Trinen also said that Nintendo is "always looking for ways to create gameplay that appeals to the entire world". One of the most difficult challenges for the game was localization, with minigames such as Sumo Wrestling being replaced with "Football" in the US. According to Ryutaro Takahashi, director of the project, "the dialogue of the characters for example is not just simple translation from Japanese; we have reviewed it so that it feels more natural." Trinen remarked that the idea behind developing Tomodachi Life was similar to Animal Crossings development, in which the question "How do you bring those key moments to live in a way that's relevant to the American consumer?'" led the development process.

Promotion
On April 10, 2014, Nintendo released a "Tomodachi Life Direct" to the official YouTube Channel, featuring the Mii characters of Nintendo's staff, such as Bill Trinen, Reggie Fils-Aimé, and Satoru Iwata, in the style of the game's "Mii News". The "Direct" goes into detail about Tomodachi Life and the idea of creating Mii characters of anyone.

On the American Tomodachi Life website, certain Miis of famous celebrities were shown that could be added into the game with the QR Code's attached to them, such as Taylor Swift and Shaquille O'Neal, each including their own custom clothing.

Reception

Tomodachi Life holds a rating of 71/100 on review aggregate site Metacritic, (72.36% on GameRankings) indicating "mixed or average reviews". IGN gave the game a score of 8.4, calling it "a surprisingly funny and rewarding experience", and The New York Times called Tomodachi Life "comedic". Polygon gave Tomodachi Life a 7.5 out of 10, praising its likeability despite certain aspects being repetitive. GamesRadar gave the game 4 out of 5 stars, praising its weird humor and relaxing gameplay, whilst criticising the minigames for being too simple. GameTrailers gave the game a score of 6.0, stating "the pervasive sense of quirkiness in Tomodachi Life works, but can’t sustain the entire game.". Similarly, Martin Robinson with Eurogamer noted "Tomodachi Life is a simple, throwaway toy, then - one with plenty of cute tricks, but not quite enough of them to stop you from tossing it aside after a handful of hours."

The game introduced unique mechanics that were noted for its charm and humor, such as a "dream" state that players could enter when an islander was asleep. According to Takahashi, this would have been difficult to implement in the west without the westernization.

Tomodachi Life was a best seller in the Japanese video game market during the week of its release, selling about 404,858 units. By September 2014, its global sales reached 3.12 million units. , Nintendo has sold 6.71 million units of the game worldwide, which made it one of the top 10 best selling games on the 3DS.

Controversy
Following the announcement of a worldwide release, controversy arose concerning the impossibility of same-sex relationships. In May 2013, a rumor emerged that a bug in the original Japanese version of the game that enabled such relationships was patched by Nintendo. This was refuted by Nintendo in a statement made April 2014, explaining that same-sex relationships were never possible, and in fact a different issue was fixed. In reality, fans had been making their Miis appear to be a different gender, which, while a workaround, did not change the Miis' pronouns. Fans were angered by the lack of such relationships, starting campaigns to add in the option.

Despite this, Nintendo stated that it would not be possible to add same-sex relationships to the game, as they "never intended to make any form of social commentary with the launch of the game", and because it would require significant development alterations which would not be able to be released as a post-game patch. The company later apologized and stated that if they were to create a third game in the series they would "strive to design a gameplay experience from the ground up that is more inclusive, and better represents all players."

Legacy
A stage based on Tomodachi Life appears in Super Smash Bros. for Nintendo 3DS and Super Smash Bros. Ultimate.

WarioWare Gold features a Tomodachi Life themed microgame, as a fast-paced minigame.

Miitomo, a social networking mobile app for iOS and Android devices, was released in March 2016. The app was created by the same core team who developed Tomodachi Life, and features very similar ideas. Miitomo was discontinued on May 9, 2018.

Miitopia, a role-playing game which similarly uses Miis as in-game characters, was released for the 3DS in Japan in 2016, followed by a worldwide release the next year. In a Nintendo Direct on February 17, 2021, it was announced that an enhanced port of Miitopia was being made for on the Nintendo Switch. This port was later released on May 21, 2021.

See also
 Miitomo
 Miitopia
 Animal Crossing - A Nintendo franchise with similar mechanics, albeit in a more laid-back tone

Notes

References

External links
 

2013 video games
Social simulation video games
Nintendo 3DS games
Nintendo 3DS eShop games
Nintendo 3DS-only games
Nintendo games
Nintendo Network games
Video games developed in Japan
Video games scored by Daisuke Matsuoka
Video games set on fictional islands